Haym Salomon, Son of Liberty is a historical novel written in 1941 by Howard Fast. The novel is about Haym Salomon, a major financier to the American cause during the American Revolution.

1941 American novels
American historical novels
Novels set during the American Revolutionary War